Madanuiyeh (also Romanized as Ma‘danū’īyeh, Ma‘danūyeh, and Ma’danoo’eyeh; also known as Madanu) is a village in Tarom Rural District, in the Central District of Hajjiabad County, Hormozgan Province, Iran. At the 2006 census, its population was 486, in 138 families.

References 

Populated places in Hajjiabad County